The 1990 Bucknell Bison football team was an American football team that represented Bucknell University during the 1990 NCAA Division I-AA football season. Bucknell tied for second in the newly renamed Patriot League. 

In their second year under head coach Lou Maranzana, the Bison compiled a 7–4 record. Mike Augsberger and Craig Cavlovic were the team captains.

The Bison outscored opponents 337 to 278. Their 3–2 conference record placed them in a three-way tie for second place in the six-team Patriot League standings. This was the first year of competition under the Patriot League banner; the league had been known as the Colonial League since 1986.

After a five-game win streak, the Bison briefly entered the national Division I-AA rankings, appearing at No. 20 in the poll released October 16. A loss dropped them out of the top 20 the next week. Bucknell finished the season unranked.

Bucknell played its home games at Christy Mathewson–Memorial Stadium on the university campus in Lewisburg, Pennsylvania.

Schedule

References

Bucknell
Bucknell Bison football seasons
Bucknell Bison football